is an island off the coast of Munakata, Fukuoka, Japan. It is considered sacred land by the local Munakata Taisha. The island's population consists of a single employee of the shrine. He is one of about two dozen Shinto priests who spend 10-day intervals on the island, praying and guarding against intruders.

The entire island is considered a shinto kami, and the island is off limits to women. One proposed reason is that Shinto views blood as impure and menstruation would desecrate the island. For centuries, only 200 men were allowed on the island on one day each year after they had "purified" themselves in the  surrounding sea.

Munakata Taisha Okitsu shrine

The Okitsu-gū shrine is located at the southwestern portion of Okinoshima. It was established in the mid 17th-century. Prior to the shrine's establishment as a sacred natural site, the surrounding site served as a location for the worship of the kami. The shrine has been maintained in relatively the same condition since the Shōwa period 1932, prior to which, it had undergone repair and rebuilding several times.

Legend
Japan’s two oldest historical documents, the Kojiki and the Nihon Shoki, include references to Okinoshima. The Kojiki states that the sun goddess Amaterasu created three daughters from a sword and sent them to Japan where they were worshiped by the Munakata clan. The Munakata Taisha, a collection of three shrines in Munakata, is dedicated to the goddesses. Locals continue to worship them for protection across the sea. Likewise, the island itself is considered a deity. The mainland has several Okinoshima worship sites as travel to the island is restricted.

Okinoshima has several traditions and taboos involving conduct both on and off the island. Ritual purification must be performed by undressing and bathing in the ocean. Nothing, even a blade of grass, may be removed from the island. No one may speak of what they have seen or heard during their stay (oiwazu-no-shima). Women are not allowed to set foot on the island (nyonin kinsei). The only men permitted on the island are priests, researchers, military, and the media. Fishermen limit themselves to the port and do not enter the interior. Prior to receiving UNESCO World Heritage status in 2017, two hundred people (all-male) would visit the island once a year to celebrate a military victory. The yearly event has been indefinitely canceled.

These restrictions contribute to Okinoshima’s reputation as a place of mystery. Other names for the island include “Island where gods dwell,” “Shosoin Treasury of the sea,” “Island of mystery,” and “The Unspoken One.” Archeological evidence dates religious rituals since the 4th century. Numerous iwakura (sacred rocks) from that time remain intact. Over 80,000 artifacts have been unearthed, which are now considered national treasures. The sacred view of Okinoshima and various taboos and prohibitions may have deterred travel to the island and preserved the artifacts.

The island's deity was said to guard a popular trade route to Korea. In exchange for safe passage, fishermen provided offerings that included swords, flat-iron ingots, elaborate mirrors and bronze dragon heads. The offerings were concealed underneath stones or scattered between boulders.

In the 1600s a Christian feudal lord, Kuroda Nagamasa, collected the offerings and put them in a tower of his castle. According to legend, the tower began to shake, bright objects streaked through the sky, and diseases plagued Nagamasa's people. Nagamasa returned the objects to the island, and the unsettling events stopped.

Today many of the treasures are on display in the Munakata shrine on Kyushu.

UNESCO Status
In 2009 the island was submitted for future inscription on the UNESCO World Heritage List as part of the serial nomination Okinoshima Island and Related Sites in Munakata Region. The island gained status as a UNESCO World Heritage site on July 9, 2017. 

Local residents had expressed their worry that the island's inclusion on the UNESCO list would cause an increase of tourism that would threaten its sacredness. Takayuki Ashizu, the chief priest at Munakata Taisha, said that regardless whether or not Okinoshima is added to the UNESCO cultural heritage list they would not open it to the public because "people shouldn't visit out of curiosity."

Important Bird Area
The island, along with the nearby reef islet of Koyajima, have been recognised as an Important Bird Area (IBA) by BirdLife International because they support populations of Japanese wood pigeons, streaked shearwaters, Japanese murrelets and Pleske's grasshopper warblers.

See also
 List of National Treasures of Japan (archaeological materials)
 World Heritage Sites in Japan
 Mount Athos

References

External links

 The Sacred Island of Okinoshima and Associated Sites in the Munakata Region

Munakata, Fukuoka
Islands of Fukuoka Prefecture
Men's quarters
World Heritage Sites in Japan
Important Bird Areas of Japan
Seabird colonies
Sacred natural sites
Men's spaces
Shinto kami
Shinto shrines in Fukuoka Prefecture